Kot  is an alpine valley in the Julian Alps in the Upper Carniola region, northwestern Slovenia. It is included in Triglav National Park in its entirety.

Kot is one of three glacial alpine valleys near Mojstrana, the others being Vrata and Krma. It is the starting point for many routes through the Triglav National Park area and one of the easier and faster routes up Mount Triglav. It leads into the Radovna Valley.

Valleys in Upper Carniola
Valleys of the Julian Alps
Municipality of Kranjska Gora
Triglav National Park